Coroner is the penultimate release by the Swiss thrash metal band Coroner. It is technically a compilation album, although it features new material as well as selected songs from the band's previous albums. It is also regarded as their final album, even though it was succeeded by a final compilation of unreleased material in 1996, titled The Unknown Unreleased Tracks 1985–95. The band chose to go into the studio for the last time, instead of releasing a greatest hits compilation, even though they had disbanded officially in 1994 (on some of the tracks, Edelmann and Broder are replaced by session musicians).

Track listing

Personnel

Coroner
Ron Broder – vocals/bass
Tommy Vetterli – guitars
Marky Edelmann – drums, vocals, producer, art direction

Additional musicians

Peter Haas – drums on tracks 2, 3 & 11
Chris Vetterli – bass on track 12
Lui Cubello – vocals (background)
Paul Degayler – vocals
Angela Giger – synthesizer
Janelle Sadler – vocals (background)
Steve Gruden – vocals (background)
Kent Smith – keyboards
Val – Conga

Other credits 

Guy Bidmead – producer, engineer
Scott Burns – mixing
Coroner – producer
Vovo Faux-Pas – engineer
Paolo Fedrigoli – producer, engineer, remixing, mixing
Jan Garber – engineer
Mischa Good – design
Pete Hinton – producer
Harris Johns – producer
Dan Johnson – mixing
Glenn Miller – mastering
Tom Morris – producer, engineer, mixing
Mark Prator – assistant engineer
Steve Rispin – engineer
Fabian Scheffold – art direction, photography
Sven Sonquest – engineer
István Vizner – art direction
Karl-Ulrich Walterbach – executive producer
Gerhard Wolfle – engineer

Notes
The samples from "Shifter" are from the 1982 documentary The Killing of America.
The samples from "Gliding above while Being Below" are from the 1980 film Altered States.
Track 14, "I Want You (She's So Heavy)" is a Beatles cover.
Track 16, "Purple Haze" is a live cover of the famous Jimi Hendrix song.
Track 8, "Der Mussolini" is a D.A.F. cover.
Tracks 4, 6, 10 and 13 are edited version of their original releases

References

External links
 BNR Metal Pages' section on Coroner
 Fan page with detailed album information and lyrics
 Coroner @ Last.fm

1995 compilation albums
Coroner (band) compilation albums
Noise Records compilation albums